Sardar Babar Khan Musakhel is a Pakistani politician who is the current Deputy Speaker of the Provincial Assembly of the Balochistan, in office since August 2018. He has been a member of the Provincial Assembly of the Balochistan since August 2018.

Political career
He was elected to the Provincial Assembly of the Balochistan as a candidate of Pakistan Tehreek-e-Insaf (PTI) from Constituency PB-1 (Musakhel-cum-Sherani)	in 2018 Pakistani general election. Following his successful election, PTI nominated him for the office of Deputy Speaker of the Provincial Assembly of the Balochistan. On 16 August 2018, he was elected as Deputy Speaker of the Balochistan Assembly. He received 36 votes against his opponent Ahmed Nawaz Baloch who secured 21 votes.

References

Living people
Deputy Speakers of the Provincial Assembly of Balochistan
Year of birth missing (living people)
Balochistan MPAs 2018–2023
Pakistan Tehreek-e-Insaf MPAs (Balochistan)